Damasko is a manufacturer of mechanical wristwatches and chronographs based in Barbing, Germany.

History
Damasko was formed in 1994 using high-performance materials technology that the founder, Konrad Damasko, had developed for applications including the aerospace industry. Until their partnership ended in 2002, Damasko was a supplier of hardened watchcases to Sinn. In 2014 Damasko released its first models based on a movement designed themselves. Prior to this time its watches had relied upon movements sourced from companies such as Valjoux, Sellita and ETA.

Technology
Damasko holds patents in the use of polycrystalline silicon for components, including the spring. Damasko has also developed a nickel-free, nitrogen enriched  martensitic alloy that is hardened up to 64 HRC/800 Vickers.

Awards and certifications
The Damasko DC56 has been certified as an official wristwatch for Eurofighter test pilots.
In 2015 the Damasko DA38 was nominated one of the best men's watches under €2000 by GQ magazine.

See also
 List of German watch manufacturers

References

German  companies established in 1994
Companies based in Bavaria
Watch brands
Watch manufacturing companies of Germany
German brands